The 2022 Tour of Scandinavia was the first edition of the expanded Ladies Tour of Norway, eighth edition overall. The race took place from 9 to 14 August 2022 and was the 19th event in the 2022 UCI Women's World Tour.

Route and stages

Stages

Stage 1 
9 August 2022 — Copenhagen to Helsingør,

Stage 2 
10 August 2022 — Orust to Strömstad,

Stage 3 
11 August 2022 — Moss to Sarpsborg,

Stage 4 
12 August 2022 — Askim to Mysen,

Stage 5 
13 August 2022 — Vikersund to Norefjell,

Stage 6 
14 August 2022 — Lillestrøm to Halden,

Classification leadership

Classification standings

General classification

Points classification

Mountains classification

Young rider classification

Team classification

References

External links 

2022 in women's road cycling
2022 UCI Women's World Tour
Tour of Scandinavia
Tour of Scandinavia
Tour of Scandinavia
Tour of Scandinavia
Tour of Scandinavia
Tour of Scandinavia